This is the 2008 THE–QS World University Rankings list of the top 200 universities in the world.

Top 200

External links
Official website

University and college rankings
2008 in education